Naushad Ali Rizvi (Urdu: نوشاد علی رضوی) (born 1 October 1943, Gwalior, British India) is a Pakistani retired Army officer and former cricketer. He retired as the colonel in Pakistan Army.

He played in six Tests in 1965 as Pakistan's wicket-keeper and opening batsman. He played first-class cricket in Pakistan from 1960 to 1979, hitting nine centuries. He has also been a match referee and administrator.

References

External links
 
 

1943 births
Living people
Muhajir people
Pakistan Test cricketers
Khyber Pakhtunkhwa cricketers
People from Gwalior
Pakistani cricketers
Karachi University cricketers
Karachi Blues cricketers
Karachi B cricketers
Karachi cricketers
Karachi Whites cricketers
East Pakistan cricketers
Rawalpindi cricketers
Peshawar cricketers
Combined Services (Pakistan) cricketers
Punjab (Pakistan) cricketers
Pakistan Eaglets cricketers
Cricket match referees
Pakistan Army officers